The Women's 4 x 100 metre medley relay 34pts swimming event at the 2004 Summer Paralympics was competed on 27 September. It was won by the team representing .

Final round

27 Sept. 2004, evening session

Team Lists

References

W
2004 in women's swimming